Thorkild Fogde (born 18 July 1965) is a Danish police officer and current commissioner of the Danish Police; he became National police commissioner on the 1 March 2020 replacing Jens Henrik Højbjerg.

Early life
Thorkild Fogde has a Master of Law degree from Aarhus Universitet from 1991. He is a former clerk for the Ministry of Justice and the Prime Minister's Office. He has also served as a Judge in the Court of Roskilde from 1993 to 1994

Police career
In 2009 Thorkild was employed as a Politidirektør in North Zealand's Police and later in 2012 as the Politidirektør for Rigspolitiet. From 2013-2017 he was the Politidirektør for Copenhagen's Police. 

In April of 2017 he became the Director for the Danish Prison and Probation Service

References 

1965 births
Living people
Chiefs of police
Danish police officers